Alopoglossus embera is a species of lizard in the family Alopoglossidae. The species is endemic to western Colombia.

Etymology
The specific name, embera, is in honor of the Emberá, an indigenous people of Colombia and Panama.

Geographic range
In Colombia, A. embra is found in Cauca Department and Valle del Cauca Department.

References

Further reading
Peloso PLV, Morales CH (2018). "Description of a New Species of Alopoglossus Boulenger, 1885 from Western Colombia (Gymnophthalmoidea)". South American Journal of Herpetology 12 (2): 89–98. (Alopoglossus embera, new species).

Alopoglossus
Reptiles of Colombia
Endemic fauna of Colombia
Reptiles described in 2017
Taxa named by Pedro L.V. Peloso